Waterford Senior Football Championship is an annual Gaelic football competition between the top Waterford clubs. The winners of the Waterford Championship qualify to represent their county in the Munster Senior Club Football Championship, the winners of which progress to the All-Ireland Senior Club Football Championship. The current senior football champions are The Nire who defeated Rathgormack  in the 2022 final played on 30 October 2022

Roll of honour

By year

Top winners

References

External links
 Official Waterford Website
 Waterford on Hoganstand
 Waterford Club GAA
 UpTheDeise.com

 
1
Senior Gaelic football county championships